The Embassy of Canada to Norway in Oslo is the diplomatic mission of Canada to Norway.

Overview 
Norway is Canada's most important Nordic trading partner and 8th largest worldwide. In 2008, Canada imported $6.2 billion worth of Norwegian goods. Canada exported $2.8 billion to Norway in 2008.

In 2008, Norway was the 12th most important source of foreign direct investment (FDI) into Canada, with $3.0 billion in FDI.

See also 
 Canada-Norway relations

References

External links 

 Embassy of Canada to Norway

Canada
Oslo
Canada–Norway relations